Menna Nasser (born 5 January 1994 in Cairo) is an Egyptian professional squash player. In August 2019, she was ranked number 51 in the world.

References

Egyptian female squash players
1994 births
Living people
21st-century Egyptian women